Sainte-Anne-du-Sault is a former municipality located in the Centre-du-Québec region of Quebec, Canada. It is merged to Daveluyville since March 9, 2016.

References

Former municipalities in Quebec
Incorporated places in Centre-du-Québec
Populated places disestablished in 2016